Laamria is a small town and rural commune in Sidi Bennour Province of the Casablanca-Settat region of Morocco. At the time of the 2004 census, the commune had a total population of 13,314 people living in 2105 households.

References

Populated places in Sidi Bennour Province
Rural communes of Casablanca-Settat